The Federal Reserve Bank of St. Louis Louisville Branch is a branch of the Federal Reserve Bank of St. Louis established in 1917. The branch is responsible for southern Indiana and central/western Kentucky.
The branch is located in the PNC Tower in downtown Louisville.

Current Board of Directors
The following people are on the board of directors as of Jan. 1, 2023:

Louisville Branch Regional Executive
The St. Louis Fed’s Louisville branch is led by Regional Executive Seema Sheth, who currently serves on the board of Metro United Way as well as the vice president and governance chair of Actors Theatre of Louisville. She has been recognized as a MOSAIC Award recipient by the Jewish Career and Family Services Foundation, the Girl Scouts of Kentuckiana, and by Louisville Business First as one of the 20 people to know in finance and has been featured in TOPS Louisville, Style Blueprint and Today's Woman magazines as a leader in business.

See also

 Federal Reserve Act
 Federal Reserve System
 Federal Reserve Districts
 Federal Reserve Branches
 Federal Reserve Bank of St. Louis
 Federal Reserve Bank of St. Louis Little Rock Branch
 Federal Reserve Bank of St. Louis Memphis Branch
 Structure of the Federal Reserve System

References

Federal Reserve branches
Economy of Louisville, Kentucky
1917 establishments in Kentucky
Banks established in 1917